Château Haut-Bages-Libéral is a winery in the Pauillac appellation of the Bordeaux region of France. Château Haut-Bages-Libéral is also the name of the red wine produced by this property. The wine produced here was classified as one of eighteen Cinquièmes Crus (Fifth Growths) in the Bordeaux Wine Official Classification of 1855.

The name Haut-Bages-Libéral is derived from the estate's location and historical owner, with Haut-Bages referring to its position at the top of the Bages plateau between Pauillac and St Julien and Libéral referring to the family who owned the estate during the 18th century. The estate is run by Claire Villars-Lurton, manager of Château Ferrière and Château La Gurge, and wife of Gonzague Lurton, owner of Château Durfort-Vivens.

History

The Libéral family settled on the estate in the 1700s. The family's business, working as an intermediary between wine producers and the market, enabled them to build a fortune and acquire vineyard land. By the 1800s, the wine's reputation was quite good, enough so that the estate was classified Cinquième Cru Classé in the Classification of 1855.

During the next century, the estate's reputation and quality waned, as phylloxera, war, and the Great Depression took their toll. The Société Civile Charreules (owned by the Cruse family) purchased the estate in 1960, and during the next decade, some of the vineyard plots adjoining Château Pontet-Canet were transferred to Pontet, which was also under the Cruse's control.

In 1982, several years after selling off Pontet-Canet, the  sold the estate off to Jacques Merlaut, head of the Taillan Group. Merlaut was owner of Château Chasse-Spleen; the Taillan Group would later acquire Château Gruaud-Larose, Château Ferrière, Château Citran, and Château La Gurgue. Merlaut's granddaughter, Claire Villars-Lurton, runs the estate today.

Vineyards and winemaking

The estate has three vineyards; the largest is adjacent to Château Latour, with a smaller plot down the road adjacent to Château Pichon-Lalande. Both of these plots are relatively close to the Gironde; the third plot is further inland, adjacent to 
Château Grand-Puy-Lacoste. The soil consists mainly of a deep bed of gravel over limestone affording drainage. Vines are replanted individually, with the varietal mix being approximately 70% Cabernet Sauvignon and 30% Merlot. In 2009, the final blend of the grand vin was 68% Cabernet, 32% Merlot.

For the grand vin, grapes are hand-harvested and fermented in temperature controlled steel tanks. Barrel aging occurs over 16 months in 40% new oak, with malolactic fermentation occurring during this time.

A second wine is produced under the labels La Fleur de Haut-Bages-Libéral and La Chapelle de Bages.

Technical informations

Visit 

Château Haut-Bages Libéral is open from Monday to Friday from 10 am to 5:30 pm.

References

External links
Château Haut-Bages-Libéral official site

Bordeaux wine producers